Da li je to čovek ili je mašina (Is that a Human or a Machine?) is the seventh studio album by the Serbian indie/alternative rock band Obojeni Program released by the Serbian independent record label UrbaNS in 2005.

Track listing 
All music and lyrics by Obojeni Program.

Personnel 
The band
 Branislav Babić "Kebra" — vocals
 Tamara Dobler — vocals, backing vocals
 Dragan Knežević — guitar, backing vocals
 Mirko Topalski — drums
 Miloš Rašković — bass guitar
 Miloš Romić — DJ

Additional personnel
 Vladimir Cinocki "Cina" — design, photography
 Vlada Žeželj — recorded by
 Ilija Vlaisavljević "Bebec" — production

References 

 Da li je to čovek ili je mašina at Discogs
 EX YU ROCK enciklopedija 1960-2006, Janjatović Petar; 
 NS rockopedija, novosadska rock scena 1963-2003, Mijatović Bogomir, SWITCH, 2005

Obojeni Program albums
2005 albums